Żołnierz zwycięstwa (The Soldier of Victory) is a 1953 Polish  biographical two-part film (combined running time: 215 minutes), portraying the life of General Karol Świerczewski. The first part, Lata walki (The Years of Struggle) deals with his earlier years, from 1905 to 1941. The second one, Zwycięzca (The Victor) depicts his life from 1944 to his death in 1947.

Cast 

 Józef Wyszomirski as General Karol Świerczewski
 Karol Wargin as young Karol Świerczewski
 Jacek Woszczerowicz as Włodzimierz Lenin
 Kazimierz Wilamowski as Józef Stalin
 Gustaw Holoubek as Feliks Dzierżyński
Józef Kozłowski as Bolesław Bierut
Rafał Kajetanowicz as Konstanty Rokossowski
 Stefan Śródka as Stefan Pawłowski
 Barbara Drapińska 
 Tadeusz Schmidt as Bronisław Bień
 Kazimierz Meres as Władek Wróblewski
 Jerzy Pietraszkiewicz as Mikołaj Gusiew
 Stanisław Gabriel Żeleński as Juan Gonzales
 Tadeusz Łomnicki 
 Barbara Rachwalska

Awards

References

External links
 

1953 films
Polish biographical films
Polish historical films
1950s Polish-language films
1950s historical films
1950s biographical films
Polish black-and-white films